Space Quest may refer to:
Space Quest, a video game series
Space Quest I, the first game in the series
SpaceQuest, Ltd., a spacecraft components and engineering company
Space Quest Casino, a space-themed casino
Space Quest (Frasier), a season 1 episode of the TV show Frasier
Space Quest (role-playing game), a tabletop role-playing game